Heterachthes hystricosus is a species of beetle in the family Cerambycidae. It was described by Martins in 1971.

Description
This beetle has a red-brown head and thorax. The elytra, legs and antennae are light brown. The antennae are longer than the body.

References

Heterachthes
Beetles described in 1971